Albert Richards Howe (January 1, 1840June 1, 1884) was an American businessman and politician. He represented Mississippi in the U.S. House of Representatives and served in the Mississippi House of Representatives.

Early life
Howe was born in Brookfield, Massachusetts, the son of Francis Howe and Maria A. (Richards) Howe. He pursued classical studies, and in 1861 enlisted as a private in the Union Army and served in the Forty-seventh Regiment of the Massachusetts Volunteer Infantry.

During the Civil War, he served in Virginia under General Grant until Robert E. Lee's surrender at Appomattox, Virginia. After Lee's surrender, he served under General Weitzel in Texas until his discharged on November 30, 1865. By the time of his discharge, he had been promoted to Major. After his military service, he moved to Como, Mississippi and became involved in cotton planting.

Political career
He became involved in politics and was a member of the Mississippi Constitutional Convention in 1868. He also served as a delegate to the Republican National Convention in 1868. In 1869 he was appointed treasurer of Panola County, Mississippi. From 1870-1872 he was a member of the Mississippi House of Representatives.

Howe was elected as a Republican candidate to the Forty-third Congress, serving from March 4, 1873, to March 3, 1875. In Congress, he served on the Committee on Claims. He was an unsuccessful candidate for reelection in 1874 to the Forty-fourth Congress.

After leaving Congress, he moved to Chicago, Illinois and worked in the brokerage business. He died in Chicago on June 1, 1884, and is interred in Brookfield Cemetery in Brookfield, Massachusetts.

Family life
Howe's father, Francis Howe, was a member of the Massachusetts House of Representatives and the Massachusetts Senate.

References

External links

 

	

1840 births
1884 deaths
People from Brookfield, Massachusetts
Union Army officers
People of Massachusetts in the American Civil War
Union Army soldiers
People from Como, Mississippi
Republican Party members of the Mississippi House of Representatives
Politicians from Chicago
Republican Party members of the United States House of Representatives from Mississippi
19th-century American politicians
Burials in Massachusetts
Military personnel from Illinois